Mike Graybill (born October 14, 1966) is a former American football tackle. He played for the Cleveland Browns in 1989, the Ohio Glory in 1992 and for the Ottawa Rough Riders from 1993 to 1994.

References

1966 births
Living people
American football tackles
Boston University Terriers football players
Cleveland Browns players
Ohio Glory players
Ottawa Rough Riders players